The following is a list of mayors of the city of Natal, in the state of Rio Grande do Norte, Brazil.

 Fabrício Gomes Pedroza, 1890-1895  
 Olímpio Tavares, 1895-1898  
 Joaquim Manoel Teixeira, 1898-1909  
 Romualdo Galvão, 1909-1916  
 , 1916-1919  
 Teodósio Paiva, 1919-1924  
 Manoel Dantas, 1924  
 , 1924-1930  
 Pedro Dias Guimarães, 1930-1931	
 , 1931-1932, 1935-1940	
 Sandoval Cavalcante, 1932-1933	
 Anibal Martins Ferreira, 1933	
 , 1933-1935	
 Joaquim Inácio Filho, 1940-1942	
 Mário Eugênio Lira, 1942-1943	
 , 1943-1946	
 , 1946-1951	
 Claudionor T. de Andrade, 1951	
 Olavo João Galvão, 1951-1952	
 Crezo Bezerra de Melo, 1952-1954	
 Wilson de Oliveira Miranda, 1954-1956	
 , 1956-1959, 1961-1964	
 José Pinto Freire, 1959-1961	
 Tertius César Rebello, 1964-1966	 
 , 1966-1969	
 Ernani Alvez da Silveira, 1969-1971	
 Ubiratan Pereira Galvão, 1971-1972	
 Jorge Ivan Cascudo Rodrigues, 1972-1975	
 , 1975-1979	
 José Agripino Maia, 1979-1982	 
 Manoel Pereira dos Santos, 1982-1983	
 , 1983-1986	
 Garibaldi Alves Filho, 1986-1989	
 Wilma de Faria, 1989-1993, 1997-2002  
 , 1993-1997	
 , 2002-2009, 2013-2018
 Micarla de Sousa, 2009-2012	   
 , 2012	
 , 2012-2013	
 , 2018-

See also
  (city council)
 Natal history
 Rio Grande do Norte history (state)
  (state)
 List of mayors of largest cities in Brazil (in Portuguese)
 List of mayors of capitals of Brazil (in Portuguese)

References

This article incorporates information from the Portuguese Wikipedia.

natal